Sir Maurice Richard Bridgeman  (26 January 1904 – 18 June 1980) was an English oilman. Bridgeman was the fourth chairman of the board of British Petroleum, serving from 1960 to 1969.

Biography
Bridgeman was the third son of the William Bridgeman, 1st Viscount Bridgeman, and Caroline, Viscountess Bridgeman, DBE (née Parker), and younger brother of the 2nd Viscount. He was educated at Eton College, Berkshire and at Trinity College, Cambridge.

In 1939, Bridgeman was petroleum advisor to the Ministry of Economic Warfare, and, from 1944–46, as Principal Assistant Secretary to the Ministry of Fuel and Power. From 1960-69, he was chairman of British Petroleum. Bridgeman was honoured as a Commander of the Order of the British Empire in 1946 and later as a Knight Commander (KBE) in 1964. He was also a Knight of the Most Venerable Order of the Hospital of St John of Jerusalem.

Family
Bridgeman married Diana Mary Erica Wilson, daughter of Humphrey Minto Wilson, on 23 February 1933. They had four daughters (Erica Jane Bridgeman, b. 20 April 1934; Teresa Anne Bridgeman, 25 October 1937 - 25 May 2019; Elizabeth Caroline Bridgeman, b. 15 March 1944; Rachel Diana Bridgeman, b. 9 March 1947).

Death
Sir Maurice Richard Bridgeman died on 18 June 1980, aged 76.

References

1904 births
1980 deaths
People educated at Eton College
Alumni of Trinity College, Cambridge
Knights Commander of the Order of the British Empire
Knights of the Order of St John
Younger sons of viscounts
Maurice
Place of death missing
BP people